The Tincha Waterfall is located in Tillore within the Indore district in the state of  Madhya Pradesh, India.

The falls

The water flow is highest immediately after the rainy season (usually after July). It goes almost dry in the summer season, and the stream is reduced to a trickle. The area around Tincha is a popular picnic and trekking spot.

Location
The nearest airport is Indore International Airport which is situated at a distance of roughly 40 km from the falls. The rest of the distance has to be covered via road or rail transport means. Tillore is the nearest town.

Rail
The nearest railway station is Indore Junction railway station near the falls at a distance of 30 km.

Road
To reach there via Road, one has to first reach Tillore town in Indore District. From where, the waterfall is situated at a distance of 9 km on internal country roads.

Accidents 
Sometimes in the past, accidents have happened near the falls. A group of students who were out for a picnic drowned. A youth slipped into the gorge in 2018.

References 

Indore

Waterfalls of Madhya Pradesh
Tourist attractions in Indore district